The Roaring Twenties is a 1939 American crime thriller film directed by Raoul Walsh and starring James Cagney, Priscilla Lane, Humphrey Bogart, and Gladys George. The film, spanning the periods between 1919 and 1933, was written by Jerry Wald, Richard Macaulay and Robert Rossen. The film follows three men and their experiences during major events in the 1920s, such as Prohibition era violence, and the 1929 stock market crash.

The picture was based on "The World Moves On", a short story by Mark Hellinger, a columnist who had been hired by Jack L. Warner to write screenplays. The movie is hailed as a classic in the gangster movie genre, and considered an homage to the classic gangster movie of the early 1930s.

The Roaring Twenties was the third and last film that Cagney and Bogart made together. The other two were Angels with Dirty Faces (1938) and The Oklahoma Kid (1939).

Plot 

Eddie Bartlett, George Hally, and Lloyd Hart meet each other in a foxhole during the final days of World War I. Following the war's end, Lloyd starts his law practice, George becomes a bootlegger, and Eddie becomes a cab driver. While unknowingly delivering a package of liquor to Panama Smith, Eddie is arrested. Panama is acquitted and after a short stint in jail, they go into the bootlegging business together. Eddie uses a fleet of cabs to deliver his liquor, and he hires Lloyd as his lawyer to handle his legal issues. He encounters Jean Sherman, a girl he formerly corresponded with during the war, and gets her a job singing in Panama's club. Eddie wants Jean as his wife, giving her an engagement ring that he asks her to hold until he's saved up enough money to quit the criminal rackets.

Eddie and his henchmen hijack a shipment of liquor belonging to fellow bootlegger Nick Brown who had refused to cooperate with him. In charge of the liquor shipment is George, who proposes that Eddie bring him in as a partner. Eddie agrees and back home they inform the authorities about one of Brown's liquor shipments. After the shipment is confiscated, Eddie and George raid the warehouse and steal it. As they are leaving, George recognizes one of the watchmen as his former sergeant that he disliked and murders him. After learning of the murder, Lloyd cuts ties with George, who then threatens to kill Lloyd if he informs on them. As the bootlegging rackets prosper, Eddie sends his friend Danny to arrange a truce with Brown, but Danny's corpse is dropped off in front of Panama's club. Eddie goes after Brown, but George, resentful of Eddie's increasing power, tips off Brown, who sets a trap. A gunfight ensues, and Eddie manages to kill Brown. Suspecting George's betrayal but unable to prove it, Eddie dissolves their partnership.

Eddie soon discovers that Jean has never really loved him, and is in fact in love with Lloyd. Subsequently, after investing in the stock market, Eddie's bootlegging empire crumbles in the 1929 crash, and he is forced to sell his cab company to George at a price far below its value. George mockingly leaves Eddie one cab for himself, stating that Eddie will soon be forced to go back to being a cab driver.

One day, Jean hails Eddie's cab and he renews his acquaintance with her and with Lloyd, meeting their young son. Lloyd now works at the district attorney's office and is preparing a case against George. The encounter leaves Eddie despondent as he still harbors feelings towards Jean, and he becomes an alcoholic.

When Jean discovers that George is planning to have Lloyd killed, she appeals to Eddie for help. He initially declines, but ultimately decides to go to George's house to ask him to have mercy on the couple. While there, Eddie is mocked again by George for his shabby looks. He then decides to have Eddie killed as he believes that Eddie will inform on him in order to help Jean, resulting in a shootout in which Eddie kills George and some of his men.

After running outside, Eddie is shot by one of George's men and collapses on the steps of a nearby church. As the police arrest the remainder of George's gang, Panama runs to Eddie and cradles his lifeless body. When a police officer begins inquiring about who Eddie was, she replies, "He used to be a big shot."

Cast

Credited Cast
 James Cagney as Eddie Bartlett
 Priscilla Lane as Jean Sherman
 Humphrey Bogart as George Hally
 Gladys George as Panama Smith
 Jeffrey Lynn as Lloyd Hart
 Frank McHugh as Danny Green
 George Meeker as Harold Masters
 Paul Kelly as Nick Brown
 Elisabeth Risdon as Mrs. Sherman
 Edward Keane as Pete Henderson
 Joseph Sawyer as Sergeant Pete Jones
 Abner Biberman as Lefty
 John Hamilton as Judge
 Robert Elliott as First Detective
 Eddie Chandler as Second Detective
 Vera Lewis as Mrs. Gray
 John Deering as the Narrator

Uncredited Cast
 Elliott Sullivan as Eddie's Cellmate
 Patrick H. O'Malley, Jr. as Jailer
 Bert Hanlon as Piano accompanist
 Joseph Crehan as Mr. Fletcher, the Foreman
 Murray Alper as First Mechanic
 Dick Wessel as Second Mechanic
 George Humbert as Luigi, Restaurant Proprietor
 Ben Welden as Tavern Proprietor
 Clay Clement as Bramfield, the Broker
 Don Thaddeus Kerr as Bobby Hart
 Ray Cook as an Orderly
 Norman Willis as Bootlegger
 Arthur Loft as Proprietor of Still 
 Al Hill, Raymond Bailey, and Lew Harvey as Ex-Cons
 Joe Devlin and Jeffrey Sayre as Order-Takers
 Paul Phillips as Mike
 Bert Hanlon as Piano Player
 Jack Norton as Drunk

 Alan Bridge as Captain
 Fred Graham as Henchman
 James Blaine as Doorman
 Henry C. Bradley and Lottie Williams as Couple in Restaurant
 John Harron as Soldier
 Lee Phelps as Bailiff
 Nat Carr as Waiter
 Wade Boteler as Policeman
 Creighton Hale as Customer
 Ann Codee as Saleswoman
 Eddie Acuff, Milton Kibbee, and John Ridgely as Cab Drivers
 Frank Mayo
 Bess Flowers as Nightclub Patron
 Frank Wilcox as Cabbie at Grand Central
 Oscar O'Shea as Customer
 Robert Armstrong as Hatted Passerby before Nightclub
 James Flavin as Policeman
 Emory Parnell as Gangster

Production 
Gladys George replaced Ann Sheridan who had replaced Lee Patrick who had replaced Glenda Farrell for the character of Panama Smith.

Anatole Litvak was the original director.

Reception 
In 2008, the American Film Institute nominated the film for its Top 10 Gangster Films list.

In 2009 Empire magazine named The Roaring Twenties #1 in a poll of the 20 Greatest Gangster Movies You've Never Seen* (*Probably).

In popular culture 
The Carol Burnett Show parodied the movie as "The Boring Twenties", with Carol Burnett parodying the Panama Smith character as Havana Jones.

References

External links

 
 
 
 
 
 
 The Roaring Twenties at Virtual History

1939 crime drama films
1939 films
American black-and-white films
1930s English-language films
American crime drama films
Films directed by Raoul Walsh
Films about prohibition in the United States
Films about organized crime in the United States
Warner Bros. films
Films set in the Roaring Twenties
Films set in the United States
Films based on short fiction
Films about financial crises
Films produced by Samuel Bischoff
Films produced by Hal B. Wallis
Films scored by Ray Heindorf
Films scored by Heinz Roemheld
Films with screenplays by Robert Rossen
Financial thrillers
1930s American films